Devin LeMahieu (born August 8, 1972) is an American businessman and Republican politician.  He is the current majority leader of the Wisconsin State Senate, since 2021, and has represented the 9th Senate district since 2015.

Early life, education and career 
LeMathieu was born in Sheboygan, Wisconsin and graduated from Sheboygan County Christian High School in 1991. LeMahieu received his bachelor's degree from Dordt College, in 1995, where he studied business administration and political science. He is the owner of The Lakeshore Weekly in Oostburg, Wisconsin.

Early political career 
LeMahieu served on the Sheboygan County Board of Supervisors as a member of the Human Resources and Finance Committees. His father, Dan LeMahieu, also served on the Sheboygan County Board (where he was the chairman) and as a member of the Wisconsin State Assembly.

Wisconsin State Senate 
On November 4, 2014, LeMahieu was elected to the Wisconsin State Senate as a Republican. He succeeded Joe Leibham, who did not run for re-election.

After Scott L. Fitzgerald was elected to the United States House of Representatives, LeMahieu was selected by a majority of the Wisconsin Senate Republican Caucus to serve as the Senate's majority leader.

He opposes the legalization of medical and recreational marijuana in Wisconsin. He argued Wisconsin would be a "rogue state" if it were to legalize medical marijuana and that there was no "actual science behind it."

In April 2021, amid the COVID-19 pandemic, LeMahieu said he opposed the Wisconsin government setting COVID-19 rules in place. He said, "I trust in people to educate themselves and make their own decisions. I don’t think at this point the government needs to tell people how to respond to the pandemic since we’re a year into this."

In October 2021, LeMahieu defended a heavily pro-Republican gerrymandered redistricting map for Wisconsin.

In January 2022, LeMahieu said that the Republican-led legislature would not confirm any of Tony Evers's appointees for the rest of Evers's term in office.

Electoral history

| colspan="6" style="text-align:center;background-color: #e9e9e9;"| General Election, November 4, 2014

| colspan="6" style="text-align:center;background-color: #e9e9e9;"| General Election, November 6, 2018

References

External links
 Senator Devin LeMahieu at Wisconsin Legislature
 Campaign website
 
 
 9th Senate District map (2011–2021)

|-

1972 births
21st-century American politicians
County supervisors in Wisconsin
Dordt University alumni
Editors of Wisconsin newspapers
Living people
People from Oostburg, Wisconsin
Politicians from Sheboygan, Wisconsin
Republican Party Wisconsin state senators